Kissa Kathmandu Mein (Chaos in Kathmandu) is a Hindi Mini-television series directed by Sandip Ray based on the Feluda story of Satyajit Ray, Jato Kando Kathmandute. This series was published in 1986-87 by DD National.

Plot
Feluda finds a fake medicine racket is operating from Nepal. He goes to Nepal with Jatayu and Topse to catch a murderer, and discovers the case to be far more complicating than it seems. While investigating, Jatayu gets drugged and Feluda meets his old enemy Maganlal Meghraj in Kathmandu.

Cast
 Shashi Kapoor as Feluda
 Mohan Agashe as Lalmohan Ganguly
 Utpal Dutt as Maganlal Meghraj
 Master Alankar Joshi as Topshe
 Moon Moon Sen

References

External links

Television shows based on Indian novels
1986 Indian television series debuts
Hindi-language television shows
Indian drama television series
Indian period television series
Films directed by Sandip Ray
1987 Indian television series endings
1980s Indian television miniseries
Television shows set in Nepal